California Frontier is a 1938 American Western film directed by Elmer Clifton and written by Monroe Shaff and Arthur Hoerl. The film stars Buck Jones, Carmen Bailey, Milburn Stone, José Pérez, Soledad Jiménez and Stanley Blystone. The film was released on December 15, 1938, by Columbia Pictures.

Plot
Halstead makes a Land Agent switch the records, which allows him to kick mexicans out of their own lands, Buck gets sent to investigate and partners up with Juan, Halstead kills the Agent to hide the records and blames Buck and Juan which are now wanted.

Cast          
Buck Jones as Buck Pearson
Carmen Bailey as Delores Cantova
Milburn Stone as Mal Halstead
José Pérez as Juan Cantova 
Soledad Jiménez as Mama Cantova 
Stanley Blystone as Graham
Carlos Villarías as Don Pedro Cantova 
Paul Ellis as Miguel Cantova
Ernie Adams as Barclay
Forrest Taylor as General Wyatt
Billy Bletcher as Bellhop
Glenn Strange as Blackie

References

External links
 

1938 films
1930s English-language films
American Western (genre) films
1938 Western (genre) films
Columbia Pictures films
Films directed by Elmer Clifton
American black-and-white films
1930s American films